Jin Chen (born 5 September 1990), also known as Gina Jin, is a Chinese actress of Hui ethnicity. She is recognized for her role in the web dramas Wu Xin: The Monster Killer and Candle in the Tomb: Mu Ye Gui Shi.

Career
Jin debuted with a minor role in the wuxia drama 2011 Peacock Feather.
She then starred in historical drama Chu Han Zhengxiong, playing the role of Consort Yu.

In 2013, Jin played her first leading role in the war drama  Tong Bai Hero. The same year, she made her film debut in the romance film Forever Love, and was nominated at the Shanghai International Film Festival for her performance in the thriller film Carpooling Shock.

In 2015, Jin rose to fame for her role as Yueya in the fantasy period drama Wu Xin: The Monster Killer. The same year, she gained increased recognition for her role in the wuxia drama The Legend of Qin.

In 2016, Jin starred as the female lead for the segment Chang Ting in the fantasy historical drama Legend of Nine Tails Fox alongside Wang Kai. 
The same year she starred in the historical drama The Imperial Doctress playing the role of Empress Wang, and fantasy action drama Chinese Paladin 5 playing dual roles as twin sisters.

In 2017, Jin played lead roles in the romance drama Little Valentine, and action adventure drama Candle in the Tomb: Mu Ye Gui Shi. In 2018, Jin starred alongside Jiro Wang in the historical romance comedy series Mengfei Comes Across.

In 2019, Jin starred alongside Li Yifeng in the period spy drama Fearless Whispers.

Filmography

Film

Television series

Variety show

Discography

Awards and nominations

References

External links
 

1990 births
Living people
Chinese film actresses
Chinese television actresses
21st-century Chinese actresses
Actresses from Shandong
Tangren Media
Hui actresses
Beijing Dance Academy alumni